A Get2Gether is a 2005 comedy film, directed by Ceon Forte, and starring B. Cole and Tony Roberts. The film was director Forte's feature-film directorial debut.

Plot
Derrick (Cole) has just gotten back home from college for his summer vacation. He's desperate to share an intimate moment with his new girlfriend Reashon (Tiffany J. Curtis), and a candle lit, couples-only gathering seems like it would provide the perfect opportunity for romance to blossom. The only problem is that Derrick's best friend Jay (Roberts) can't find a date for the party. Bitter at being snubbed by his best friend for a girl, Jay invites everyone in the hood to Derrick's party and it's not too long before the house is overflowing with eager party seekers.

External links

2005 films
2005 comedy films
African-American comedy films
2005 directorial debut films
2000s English-language films
2000s American films